The 1961–62 Wake Forest Demon Deacons men's basketball team represented Wake Forest University.

Roster

Schedule and results

|-
!colspan=9 style=| Regular Season

|-
!colspan=9 style=| ACC Tournament

|-
!colspan=9 style=| NCAA Tournament

NCAA basketball tournament
East 
Wake Forest 92, Yale 82
Wake Forest 96, St. Joseph’s, Pennsylvania 85
Wake Forest 79, Villanova 69
Final Four
Ohio State 84, Wake Forest 68
Third-place game
Wake Forest 82, UCLA 80

Rankings

Awards and honors
 Len Chappell – ACC Player of the Year (2x)

Team players drafted into the NBA

Other notable players
 Billy Packer, who would become famous as a college basketball broadcaster.

References

Wake Forest
Wake Forest Demon Deacons men's basketball seasons
NCAA Division I men's basketball tournament Final Four seasons
Wake Forest